Ironville is a community in the Canadian province of Nova Scotia, located in the Cape Breton Regional Municipality on Cape Breton Island. Formerly known as Boisdale Barrachois, the community was renamed when a separate post office was setup within the area in 1878, just east of Boisdale, and a new name to distinguish it from Boisdale and Barrachois was needed. Since iron was discovered here in 1886, the name Ironville was chosen, on August 1, 1907.

References

 Ironville on Destination Nova Scotia

Communities in the Cape Breton Regional Municipality
General Service Areas in Nova Scotia